Anisus spirorbis is a species of small freshwater air-breathing snail, an aquatic pulmonate gastropod mollusk in the family Planorbidae, the ram's horn snails.

Taxonomy
Anisus spirorbis may be a broad-whorled morphotype of Anisus leucostoma.

Distribution 
Europe to Siberia.

This species occurs in countries that include:
 Czech Republic – vulnerable (VU)
 Slovakia
 Germany – high endangered (Stark gefährdet)
 Poland
 Ireland
 Great Britain
 Uzbekistan
 Siberia

Description
The shell is 1 to 1.5 mm high and measures 4 to 5.5 mm in diameter. It has approximately 4.5 whorls. The mouth is oblique to the axis of the coil. The whorls are increase relatively rapidly (in relation to other Anisus species). The shell is yellowish horn coloured and bears thin growth strips. The body of the animal is grey-brownish black with lighter colored tentacles.

Ecology
Parasites:
 This species serves as first intermediate host for Prosthogonimus ovatus
 Dendritobilharzia loossi – Anisus spirorbis is an intermediate host.

References

I, p. 402 pp
 Studer, S. (1820). Kurzes Verzeichnis der bis jetzt in unserm Vaterlande entdeckten Conchylien. Naturwissenschaftlicher Anzeiger der Allgemeinen Schweizerischen Gesellschaft für die Gesammten Naturwissenschaften, 3 (11): 83-90; (12): 91-94. Bern
 Glöer P. & Pešić V. (2012) The freshwater snails (Gastropoda) of Iran, with descriptions of two new genera and eight new species. ZooKeys 219: 11–61

External links
Anisus spirorbis at Animalbase
 Linnaeus, C. (1758). Systema Naturae per regna tria naturae, secundum classes, ordines, genera, species, cum characteribus, differentiis, synonymis, locis. Editio decima, reformata [10th revised edition, vol. 1: 824 pp. Laurentius Salvius: Holmiae]
 Sacco, F. (1886). Fauna malacologica delle alluvioni plioceniche del Piemonte. Memorie della Reale Accademia delle Scienze di Torino, Serie II. 37: 169-206

Planorbidae
Gastropods described in 1758
Taxa named by Carl Linnaeus